The General Manager of the Year Award is given annually to the National Lacrosse League general manager who has done the best job of ensuring his team's success.

Past winners

References

General Manager
+